The 2022 UIM F1 H2O World Championship was the 38th season of Formula 1 Powerboat racing. Shaun Torrente won the championship.

Teams and drivers

Season calendar

References

2022 in motorsport
2022
2022 in boat racing